Davoud Ali Maleki  (Persian: داوود على ملكى; born 26 December 1952) is a retired Iranian featherweight weightlifter. He placed fourth at the 1974 World Weightlifting Championships and sixth at the 1976 Summer Olympics.

Maleki was a third son in a family of four brothers and two sisters.

References

1952 births
Living people
Iranian male weightlifters
Olympic weightlifters of Iran
Weightlifters at the 1976 Summer Olympics
People from Zanjan, Iran
20th-century Iranian people